Orerokpe is the headquarters of Okpe LGA in Delta state, Nigeria and the seat of the Orodje of Okpe Kingdom, H.R.M Orhue I.

Populated places in Delta State